Bukit Baka Bukit Raya National Park  is a national park located on Borneo Island, Indonesia. It is named after the mountains of Bukit Baka and Bukit Raya, part of the Schwaner mountain range at the border of Central and West Kalimantan.

The national park forms part of the Heart of Borneo conservation project.

Flora and fauna
There have been 817 species of plant recorded in the park, including from the families of Dipterocarpaceae, Myrtaceae, Sapotaceae, Euphorbiaceae, Lauraceae and Ericaceae. Plants endemic to the island include Symplocos rayae, Gluta sabahana, Dillenia beccariana, Lithocarpus coopertus, Selaginnella magnifica and Tetracera glaberrima.

The park protects the habitat of clouded leopards, orangutans, sun bears (Helarctos malayanus euryspilus), maroon leaf monkeys, slow lorises (Nycticebus coucang borneanus), sambar deer  and flying squirrels. Bird species in the park include the black hornbill, helmeted hornbill, common emerald dove, little cuckoo-dove, Bornean White-Bearded Gibbon  and Bornean peacock-pheasant.

Human habitation
Indigenous people in the park include the ethnic groups of the Dayak Limbai, Ransa, Kenyilu, Ot Danum, Malahui, Kahoi and Kahayan.

Conservation and threats
In 1978 a nature reserve of 500 km2 around Bukit Raya was established, and the next year it was extended to 1,100 km2. In 1982 the Bukit Baka nature reserve was established, comprising 1,000 km2. After several smaller alterations to the boundaries of both reserves, in 1992 the two protected areas were merged into the Bukit Baka Bukit Raya National Park comprising 1,810 km2.

The park has been affected by severe illegal logging since the end of the 20th century.

References

National parks of Indonesia
Geography of Central Kalimantan
Geography of West Kalimantan
Protected areas established in 1992
Tourist attractions in West Kalimantan
Protected areas of Kalimantan
Tourist attractions in Central Kalimantan
Borneo montane rain forests
Borneo lowland rain forests